was a Japanese novelist.

She was awarded the prestigious Naoki Prize in 1996 for the novel Yamahaha.

Life 
Born in Sakawa, Takaoka District, Kōchi Prefecture, she graduated from Nara Women's University, after which she studied for a while at the Polytechnic University of Milan. After returning to Japan, she became a freelance writer.

She lived for some time in Tahiti and Lido di Venezia, and opened an Italian café in 2009 in her home province, Kōchi.

After being diagnosed with tongue cancer in 2013, she died on January 27, 2014.

The kitten-killing incident
In August 2006, in two separate essays in the Nihon Keizai Shimbun, she revealed that she had killed kittens by throwing them off a cliff while living in Tahiti.

Yuriko Koike, who was Japan's minister of the environment at the time, said that "what Ms. Bandō had done was regrettable from the point of view of an animal lover".

About a month later, the Polynesian government was reported to have begun investigating it as a case of animal cruelty.

Bandō rebuked the criticism in the Mainichi Shimbuns Tokyo evening edition, saying that as long as there was no official report from the Polynesian government's side, she considered the criticism against her to be a case of suppression of freedom of speech.

Awards
1982 The Mainichi Children's Literature Award for Newcomers
1994 The first Japan Horror Fiction Award
1996 The third Shimase Renai Literature Award
1996 The 116th Naoki Prize 
2002 The 15th Shibata Renzaburō Award

References

External links 
 Profile at J'Lit Books from Japan

1958 births
2014 deaths
Japanese women novelists
20th-century Japanese women writers
21st-century Japanese women writers
People from Kōchi Prefecture
Writers from Kōchi Prefecture
Deaths from oral cancer
Deaths from cancer in Japan
Animal cruelty incidents
Nara Women's University alumni